Zephronia is a genus of giant pill millipedes in the family Zephroniidae. This genus includes 47 species distributed throughout N. India, Myanmar, Thailand, Malayan Peninsula, Java, Sumatra and Borneo.

Species
Species within this genus include:

 Zephronia alticola Attems, 1936
 Zephronia anthracina Pocock, 1895
 Zephronia butleri Olliff, 1882
 Zephronia clivicola Pocock, 1890
 Zephronia comotti Pocock, 1890
 Zephronia dawydoffi Attems, 1953
 Zephronia debilis Attems, 1936
 Zephronia densipora Attems, 1936
 Zephronia disparipora Attems, 1936
 Zephronia dollfusi Pocock, 1895
 Zephronia doriae Pocock, 1890
 Zephronia enghoffi Srisonchai, Sutcharit & Likhitrakarn, 2021
 Zephronia feae Pocock, 1890
 Zephronia floweri Hirst, 1907
 Zephronia formosa Pocock, 1890
 Zephronia gestri Pocock, 1890
 Zephronia glaberrima Attems, 1898
 Zephronia golovatchi Srisonchai, Sutcharit & Likhitrakarn, 2021
 Zephronia hirsti Jeekel, 2001
 Zephronia hirta Attems, 1936
 Zephronia hysophila Attems, 1936
 Zephronia impunctata Pocock, 1895
 Zephronia inferior Attems, 1936
 Zephronia juvenis Attems, 1936
 Zephronia konkakinhensis Semenyuk, Golovatch & Wesener, 2018
 Zephronia lannaensis Likhitrakarn & Golovatch, 2021
 Zephronia laotica Wesener, 2019
 Zephronia lignivora Attems, 1936
 Zephronia maculata (Butler, 1874)
 Zephronia montana Karsch, 1881
 Zephronia montis Semenyuk, Golovatch & Wesener, 2018
 Zephronia nepalensis Wesener, 2015
 Zephronia nigrinota Butler, 1872
 Zephronia ovalis Gray, 1832
 Zephronia panhai Srisonchai, Sutcharit & Likhitrakarn, 2021
 Zephronia pellita Attems, 1935
 Zephronia phrain Likhitrakarn & Golovatch, 2021
 Zephronia profuga Attems, 1936
 Zephronia ridleyi Hirst, 1907
 Zephronia semilaevis Pocock, 1890
 Zephronia siamensis Hirst, 1907
 Zephronia specularis Attems, 1936
 Zephronia tigrina Butler, 1872
 Zephronia tigrinoides Attems, 1936
 Zephronia tumida Butler, 1882
 Zephronia viridescens Attems, 1936
 Zephronia viridisoma Rosenmejer & Wesener, 2021

References

Sphaerotheriida
Millipedes of Asia
Taxa named by George Robert Gray
Zephroniidae